Carlos Manuel de Céspedes Municipal Museum is a museum located in the 17th street in Carlos Manuel de Céspedes, Cuba. It was established on 30 December 1982.

The museum holds collections on history and weaponry.

See also 
 List of museums in Cuba

References 

Museums in Cuba
Buildings and structures in Camagüey Province
Museums established in 1982
1982 establishments in Cuba
20th-century architecture in Cuba